Mitsuko is a feminine Japanese given name.

Possible writings
The name Mitsuko is generally written with the kanji characters 光 and 子 which, when translated into English can mean "light, child" or "shining, child". However Mitsuko can have different meanings depending on which kanji characters are used to write the name. Some possible variations of the name Mitsuko are:
光子, "light, child"
充子, "provide, child"
満子, "satisfy/full, child"
睦子, "harmonious/intimate/friendly, child"
三子, "third child"
密子, "carefulness/secrecy, child"
蜜子, "honey/nectar/molasses, child"

People with the name
Mitsuko Baisho (倍賞 美津子 Baishō Mitsuko), a Japanese actress 
Mitsuko Coudenhove (クーデンホーフ 光子 Kūdenhōfu Mitsuko), the mother of Richard von Coudenhove-Kalergi
, Japanese concubine
Mitsuko Horie (堀江 美都子 Horie Mitsuko, born 1957), a Japanese singer and voice actress
, Japanese ice hockey player
Mitsuko Mito (水戸光子 Mito Mitsuko, 1919–1981), a Japanese actress
Mitsuko Mori (森 光子 Mori Mitsuko, 1920–2012), a Japanese actress
, Japanese sailor
Mitsuko Shiga (四賀 光子 Shiga Mitsuko, 1885–1976), a Japanese tanka poet
, Japanese high jumper
Mitsuko Uchida (内田 光子 Uchida Mitsuko), Japanese naturalized-British classical pianist
Mitsuko Yoshikawa (吉川 満子 Yoshikawa Mitsuko, 1901–1991), a Japanese actress

Fictional characters
 Mitsuko Komyoji, a central character in the Android Kikaider manga and anime series
 Mitsuko Souma, a central character in the Battle Royale novel, film, and manga
 Mitsuko the Boar, a character from the Bloody Roar video game series
 Mitsouko Yorisaka, a character in Claude Farrère's novel La Bataille, and the namesake of Guerlain's perfume "Mitsouko"
 Mitsuko Krieger, a character in Archer (2009 TV series), the holographic anime-style "wife" of Algernop Krieger.
 Mitsuko Hama, a character from the manga Sazae-san

References

See also
Mitzi

Japanese feminine given names